Gymnadenia runei is an orchid of the genus Gymnadenia. It is endemic in Sweden and only found in a few localities in the Tärnaby mountains. It grows in localities like calcium rich meadows in the mountains. The species was discovered by Swedish botanist Olof Rune in 1960 but it was not described as a separate species until 1989, originally under the name Gymnigritella runei.

runei